Alejandro “Alex” Sanabia (born September 8, 1988) is a right-handed pitcher for the Gastonia Honey Hunters of the Atlantic League of Professional Baseball. He has played in Major League Baseball (MLB) for the Florida/Miami Marlins.

Career

Florida/Miami Marlins
Prior to playing professionally, Sanabia attended Castle Park High School in Chula Vista, California. He was drafted by the Florida Marlins in the 32nd round of the 2006 amateur draft and began his professional career that season, playing for the GCL Marlins. With them, he went 3-1 with a 3.24 ERA in 11 relief appearances. He pitched for the Jamestown Jammers in 2007, going 2-6 with a 5.13 ERA in 15 starts. In 2008 with the Greensboro Grasshoppers, he went 5-5 with a 4.93 ERA in 19 starts. With the Jupiter Hammerheads in 2009, Sanabia went 9-5 with a 3.45 ERA in 19 games (18 starts). He began the 2010 season with the Jacksonville Suns, going 5-1 with a 2.03 ERA in 14 starts prior to his call up.

He made his major league debut on June 24, 2010, pitching 3.1 innings in relief and posting an ERA of 5.40 against the Baltimore Orioles. He appeared in 15 games for the Marlins that year, making 12 starts, going 5-3 with a 3.73 ERA.

In 2011, he went 0-0 with a 3.27 ERA in three games (two starts). In the minor leagues, he went 0-5 with a 5.75 ERA. He began 2012 with the Triple-A New Orleans Zephyrs. He finished the 2012 season with the Zephyrs going 6-7 with a 4.06 ERA, a 1.31 WHIP, in 88.2 innings pitched, with 24 walks, 63 strikeouts in 17 games started.

On April 5, 2013 he made his first start since 2011, pitching 6 shutout innings against the Mets and picking up the win. On May 20 in a start against the Phillies, Sanabia gained infamy for spitting on the baseball and proceeding to throw it, something he claimed he didn't know was illegal. He got the win in that start, giving up 1 run in 6.1 innings. His next start, against the White Sox, was limited to 4 innings due to groin injury, and he was placed on the disabled list, and his season was ended.

Arizona Diamondbacks
Sanabia was claimed off waivers by the Arizona Diamondbacks on October 4, 2013. On April 16, 2014, Sanabia was outrighted off of the 40-man roster. On May 5, 2014, Sanabia was released by the Diamondbacks.

Second Stint with Marlins
Sanabia returned to the Marlins on a minor league contract on May 8, 2014. His 2014 minor league stats with both teams were a combined 7-5 record, a 4.70 ERA, a 1.49 WHIP, and 104 strikeouts in 134 innings pitched.

Los Angeles Angels
On November 24, 2014, Sanabia signed a minor league contract with the Los Angeles Angels organization. He spent the season with the Triple-A Salt Lake Bees and elected free agency on November 6, 2015.

Toros de Tijuana
On March 7, 2016, Sanabia signed with the Toros de Tijuana of the Mexican Baseball League.

Chicago Cubs
On May 9, 2016, Sanabia had his contract purchased by the Chicago Cubs and was assigned to the Triple-A Iowa Cubs. On June 13, 2016, the Cubs organization released Sanabia after he posted a 6.34 ERA in Iowa.

Toros de Tijuana (second stint)
On June 16, 2016, Sanabia signed with the Toros de Tijuana of the Mexican Baseball League. Sanabia pitched to a 3.86 ERA with a 3-1 record in 11 games for the Toros in 2017. Sanabia began the 2018 season on the disabled list.

Tecolotes de los Dos Laredos
On July 27, 2018, Sanabia was traded to the Tecolotes de los Dos Laredos to complete a deal that saw the Tecolotes acquire Sergio Mitre.

Rieleros de Aguascalientes/Bravos de León
On January 9, 2019, Sanabia was traded to the Rieleros de Aguascalientes of the Mexican League. He was loaned to the Bravos de León on July 10, 2019, for the remainder of the 2019 season. He was returned to the Rieleros following the 2019 season. Between the two clubs, Sanabia pitched to a 7.37 ERA with 70 strikeouts in 101.1 innings pitched across 22 games. He was released on March 8, 2020.

York Revolution
On March 9, 2021, Sanabia signed with the York Revolution of the Atlantic League of Professional Baseball. In 6 games with York, Sanabia logged a 3-0 record and 2.43 ERA.

New York Mets
On June 29, 2021, Sanabia’s contract was purchased by the New York Mets organization. Sanabia pitched to a 4.34 ERA in 12 appearances split between the Triple-A Syracuse Mets and Double-A Binghamton Rumble Ponies. On November 7, Sanabia elected free agency.

York Revolution (second stint)
On February 22, 2022, Sanabia re-signed with the York Revolution of the Atlantic League of Professional Baseball.

Gastonia Honey Hunters
On August 16, 2022, Sanabia was traded to the Gastonia Honey Hunters of the Atlantic League of Professional Baseball.

References

External links

1988 births
Living people
American expatriate baseball players in Mexico
Baseball players from San Diego
Bravos de León players
Charros de Jalisco players
Florida Marlins players
Greensboro Grasshoppers players
Gulf Coast Marlins players
Jacksonville Suns players
Jamestown Jammers players
Jupiter Hammerheads players
Major League Baseball pitchers
Mexican League baseball pitchers
Miami Marlins players
Navegantes del Magallanes players
American expatriate baseball players in Venezuela
New Orleans Zephyrs players
Reno Aces players
Rieleros de Aguascalientes players
Salt Lake Bees players
Sportspeople from Chula Vista, California
Surprise Saguaros players
Syracuse Mets players
Tecolotes de los Dos Laredos players
Toros de Tijuana players
York Revolution players